Caroline Phillips may refer to:
Caroline Phillips (journalist) (1874–1956), Scottish feminist, suffragette and journalist
Caroline Phillips (archaeologist), New Zealand archaeologist
Caroline Phillips (visual artist), Australian visual artist